The 2022–23 Sunshine Tour is the 23rd season of professional golf tournaments since the southern Africa-based Sunshine Tour was relaunched in 2000. The Sunshine Tour represents the highest level of competition for male professional golfers in the region.

The tour is based predominantly in South Africa with other events being held in Zimbabwe.

It was the first season in which the Order of Merit was rebranded as the Luno Order of Merit, using a points-based system rather than money earned.

The season also marked the return of the FBC Zim Open, having not been played since 2018.

Schedule
The following table lists official events during the 2022–23 season.

Unofficial events
The following events were sanctioned by the Sunshine Tour, but did not carry official money, nor were wins official.

Notes

References

External links

Sunshine Tour
Sunshine Tour
Sunshine Tour
Sunshine Tour